Psychroglaciecola  is a genus of bacteria from the family Methylobacteriaceae with one known species (Psychroglaciecola arctica).

References

Monotypic bacteria genera
Hyphomicrobiales
Bacteria genera